The 2021 Thai FA Cup Final was the final match of the 2020–21 Thai FA Cup, the 27th season of Thailand's national cup competition. It was played at the Thammasat Stadium in Pathum Thani on 11 April 2021 and contested by Chiangrai United and Chonburi.

Road to the final

Note: In all results below, the scores of the finalists are given first (H: home; A: away; T1: Clubs from the Thai League 1; T2: Clubs from the Thai League 2; T3: Clubs from the Thai League 3; T4: Clubs from the Thailand Amateur League.

Match

Assistant referees:
 Pattarapong Kijsathit
 Komsan Kampan
Fourth official:
 Songkran Bunmeekiart
Video assistant referees:
 Teetichai Nualjan
 Chaowalit Poonprasit
Match commissioner:
 Pakasit Suwannanon
Referee assessor:
 Praew Semaksuk
General coordinator:
 Kittipon Thongrat

Winners

Prizes
The winners received 5,000,000 THB in prize money, as well as qualification for the 2022 AFC Champions League group stage and the 2021 Thailand Champions Cup.

The runners-up received 1,000,000 THB in prize money.

See also
 2020–21 Thai League 1
 2020–21 Thai League 2
 2020–21 Thai League 3
 2020–21 Thai FA Cup
 2020 Thailand Champions Cup

References

External links
Thai League official website

2021
2